Thisvi is a village and a former municipality in Boeotia, Greece. Since the 2011 local government reform it is part of the municipality Thebes, of which it is a municipal unit. The municipal unit has an area of 245.492 km2, the community 39.350 km2. Population 2,476 (2011).

The municipal unit consists of the communities of Chostia, Domvraina, Ellopia, Thisvi and Xironomi. The seat of the former municipality was in Domvraina. The municipal unit is named after the Mycenaean city (now ruined) of Thisbe, which is mentioned by Homer in the Iliad's Catalogue of Ships as a participant in the Trojan War. The scant remains of the Mycenaean acropolis that is surrounded by Cyclopean walls is located on a hill called Palaiokastro which is to the Northwest of the town.

References

External links
 Book in Greek (2016):  "Beotians in America", (Γ.Ε. Αντωνίου)

Populated places in Boeotia